The Senegalese Rugby Federation is the governing body for rugby union in Senegal. It is a member of the Confederation of African Rugby (CAR) and a member of the International Rugby Board.

References

External links
 Official Site

Rugby union governing bodies in Africa
Rugby union in Senegal